An accumulator is an energy storage device: a device which accepts energy, stores energy, and releases energy as needed. Some accumulators accept energy at a low rate (low power) over a long time interval and deliver the energy at a high rate (high power) over a short time interval. Some accumulators accept energy at a high rate over a short time interval and deliver the energy at a low rate over longer time interval. Some accumulators typically accept and release energy at comparable rates. Various devices can store thermal energy, mechanical energy, and electrical energy. Energy is usually accepted and delivered in the same form. Some devices store a different form of energy than what they receive and deliver performing energy conversion on the way in and on the way out.

Examples of accumulators include steam accumulators, mainsprings, flywheel energy storage, hydraulic accumulators, rechargeable batteries, capacitors, inductors, compensated pulsed alternators (compulsators), and pumped-storage hydroelectric plants.

In general usage in an electrical context, the word accumulator normally refers to a lead–acid battery.

The London Tower Bridge is operated via an accumulator. The original raising mechanism was powered by pressurised water stored in several hydraulic accumulators. In 1974, the original operating mechanism was largely replaced by a new electro-hydraulic drive system.

See also 
 Rechargeable battery

References

Bibliography 

Energy storage

cs:Akumulátor
nl:Accumulator#Accumulatie van energie
ru:Аккумулятор